Benjamin Baxter Dailey was the keeper of several lifeboat stations for the United States Life-Saving Service—one of the precursor services to the United States Coast Guard.
On December 22, 1884, when he commanded the Cape Hatteras Lifeboat Station, he led the rescue of nine men from the Ephraim Williams.  For this rescue, Dailey and his crew were awarded the Gold Lifesaving Medal

The stranded men had been shipwrecked in a heavy storm for 90 hours, five miles, or seven miles, off the coast of Cape Hatteras.
According to Life magazine Dailey explained in his report to superiors that he wasn't able to draft a report on the rescue for seven days as his hands were too raw from the exertion.

The US National Park Service's has preserved Dailey's medal at its Hatteras Museum.

In 2014 the Coast Guard published a list of ten individuals who were to be namesakes for Sentinel class cutters.
All the Sentinel class cutters are to be named after men and women who have been recognized as heroes serving in the US Coast Guard, or a precursor service. Dailey was named in the second cohort of heroes, and the USCGC Benjamin B. Dailey was accepted by the Coast Guard in April 2017.  The cutter was commissioned in Pascagoula, MS on 4 July 2017, with almost 100 members of the Dailey family in attendance.

David Stick, author of "Graveyard of the Atlantic: Shipwrecks of the North Carolina Coast", described the wills made out by Dailey and his crew, when he commanded the Creed's Hill Lifesaving Station in April 1881, prior to setting out on a particularly dangerous rescue effort.

References

External links

1844 births
1914 deaths
Recipients of the Gold Lifesaving Medal
United States Life-Saving Service personnel
Place of birth missing